Mills-Tui was an Australian manufacturer of heavily specialised vehicles in Narangba, Queensland.

History
Mills-Tui Australia was established in 1999 when the fire appliance business of Austral was purchased from the administrators of Clifford Corporation.

In 2001 it purchased the rights to the Majestic coach and Orbit bus bodies from Queensland Coach Company with AAT Kings and Greyhound Australia major customers. It also built ambulance bodies.

In September 2014, Mills-Tui ceased trading.

Mills-Tui New Zealand continues to trade and is not related to Mills-Tui Australia

References

External links

Bus Australia gallery

Bus manufacturers of Australia
Fire service vehicle manufacturers
Vehicle manufacturing companies established in 1999
Vehicle manufacturing companies disestablished in 2014
1999 establishments in Australia
2014 disestablishments in Australia